Chodae Community Church, formerly called Cho Dae Presbyterian Church, is a Korean Presbytery Church located in Norwood, New Jersey.  The church, founded in 1986, has several different ministries catering to people of different cultures and languages.  These include ministries catering to those who speak English, Japanese, and Korean. The church also caters to different generations ranging from toddlers to adults.

The church is headed by Reverend Kyusam Han.  The church engages in missionary work to countries across the globe.  The church also invests locally through the Norwood community.

The church owns its own building and include two sanctuaries, classrooms, a gymnasium, and a kitchen.

By 2000, the congregation had grown to 700 members and the church sought approval from the borough for the construction of a $5 million,  facility on a  site that would include a sanctuary large enough to accommodate 720 worshipers. A local citizens group, the Norwood Civic Association was created to oppose church's plans, with more than one-third of all resident families joining the organization, which argued that the size of the proposed church would cause flooding and cause congestion on Sundays, given the proximity between the proposed site and the borough's athletic complex.

References

External links
Chodae Community Church (in Korean)
Mosaic Ministry
Revolutionaries

Norwood, New Jersey
Churches in Bergen County, New Jersey
Korean-American culture in New Jersey
Presbyterian churches in New Jersey
Religious organizations established in 1986
1986 establishments in New Jersey